The NBA on ESPN is the branding used for the presentation of National Basketball Association (NBA) games on the ESPN family of networks. The ESPN cable network first televised NBA games from 1982 until 1984, and has been airing games currently since the 2002–03 NBA season. ESPN2 began airing a limited schedule of NBA games in 2002. ESPN on ABC began televising NBA games in 2006 (ABC Sports aired NBA games under the title of the NBA on ABC from 2002 to 2006). On October 6, 2014, ESPN and the NBA renewed their agreement through 2025.

ABC

ESPN on ABC is the broadcast home of the NBA. ABC airs games on Christmas Day and under the title of NBA Saturday Primetime, airs on Saturday nights, and NBA Sunday Showcase, airs on Sunday afternoons from January/February through the end of the season, continuing to air games throughout the early rounds of the NBA Playoffs, culminating with exclusive coverage of the NBA Finals.

ESPN

First incarnation (1982–1984)

Background
On January 30, 1982, the NBA reached a two-year agreement with ESPN to broadcast the league's 40 regular season and 10 playoff games from 1982–83 until 1983–84.

Initially from 1982-83 until 1983-84, ESPN aired the league's regular season games every Sunday.

Announcers
Greg Gumbel and John Andariese were some of the voices of the original telecasts of The NBA on ESPN, which lasted only two seasons. Tom Mees was among the studio hosts. During a commercial break of a game at Madison Square Garden, the announcers (Greg Gumbel and Chris Berman) danced to the song "Little Darling" that was played on the public address system of the arena. That blooper reel is still often played when ESPN celebrates a milestone.

Other announcers during this period included:
 Irv Brown (game analyst)
 Ken Charles (game analyst)
 Jim Simpson (play-by-play)
 Roger Twibell (play-by-play)
 Dick Vitale (game analyst)
 Fred White (play-by-play)
 Geoff Witcher (play-by-play)

Current incarnation (2002–present)

Background
On January 22, 2002, the NBA signed an initial six-year agreement with The Walt Disney Company that allowed ABC and its sister network ESPN (of which Disney owned a 80% stake) to broadcast the league's 75 regular season and 24 playoff games.

In June 2007, and again in October 2014, the NBA renewed its television agreement with ESPN, as well as TNT, with the current contract extending through the 2024–25 season.

Overview
ESPN airs NBA games on Wednesdays, Fridays, and Sundays. Most NBA games on the ESPN cable network air on Fridays at 7:30 p.m. ET and 8 p.m. PT (10 p.m. ET) as part of "Coast to Coast" doubleheaders. Games on Wednesdays are mostly single games, televised at 9:30 p.m. ET (usually following an ACC college basketball game. If ESPN does not air an college basketball game, then it follows the Friday format). In addition to games on ABC, several Sundays throughout the season also feature ESPN televised games, usually during the evening, though on most nights ESPN defers to NBA TV for Sunday night national broadcasts.

ESPN's presentation of games is referred to as NBA (name of day) (i.e., NBA Wednesday, NBA Friday and NBA Sunday). The telecast also was formerly known as ESPNBA. ESPN used to brand a few other games under the NBA Special Edition brand, but dropped the name in favor of the NBA (name of day) format in the 2013–14 season and beyond (e.g., NBA Monday); should the game air on a holiday, ESPN brands it according to the special occasion. Unless specified, ESPN's NBA broadcasts are not exclusive, in which local sports networks may still air the game in their home market. Likewise the first round playoff coverage is not exclusive.

As part of the NBA's cable-heavy TV deal, ESPN airs one Conference final per year; since the 2004 NBA playoffs, ESPN airs the Eastern Conference Finals in even-numbered years and the Western Conference Finals in odd-numbered years. Most conference final games are televised on ESPN itself, with usually Game 1, 4 and/or Game 7 set aside for ABC. Outside of the Conference Finals, ESPN airs playoff games only on Thursdays (starting the conference semi-finals), Fridays and Saturdays (with competitor TNT airing the majority of games on the other nights of the week).

ESPN airs the NBA draft each season since 2003, as well as the NBA draft lottery (with the exception of 2003, when ABC aired the Draft Lottery prior to a Conference Final game on TNT).

The game between the New York Knicks and the Miami Heat on December 17, 2010, was the first NBA game ever aired on 3D, courtesy of ESPN 3D. The network aired 14 NBA regular season games, as well as select playoff games, in 3D that season.

Music and Graphics

Starting with 2006–07 NBA season, ESPN used ABC's theme music from two years prior, making it the second time the network had used its corporate sibling's NBA theme. Since ABC had undergone the transition from the former ABC Sports to merge with ESPN, forming ESPN on ABC, ESPN's music, graphics, and overall presentation have been used for all of their telecasts on the network.

Following the branding merge, ESPN began to use variations of the graphics used on ESPN Monday Night Football for their NBA broadcasts. With an updated graphics package debuting on Monday Night Football during the 2008–09 season , the same graphics were introduced in the April 8, 2009 telecast of NBA on ESPN.

On March 14, 2010, the graphics were refreshed and used in the NBA on ABC "Sunday Showcase". ESPN then used the refreshed graphics for their NBA telecasts the following day. Starting with the 2010–11 season, timeout indicators were added to the score banner, adopting the feature from ESPN's college football broadcasts.

Beginning with the 2011 NBA Playoffs, an updated composition of ESPN's theme "Fast Break" was introduced for the postseason, along with new in-game presentations. The score banner and other graphics retained their design, and the original composition of "Fast Break" remained as the theme song for the regular season.

During the 2013 Western Conference Finals, a new graphics package debuted for ESPN's NBA telecasts. The graphics featured 3-dimensional renderings of the team logos, along with the use of specific themes and backgrounds to accompany each of them. During the 2015 NBA Finals, the graphics were updated to reflect the new design used in ESPN's NBA Countdown broadcasts.  However, during 2015-16 NBA season, the graphics were reverted to the previous package used since 2013.  On May 17, 2016, the graphics, which were first seen during the previous year's championship, were used again for the 2016 Eastern Conference Finals and NBA Finals.

For the 2016–17 NBA season, ESPN introduced a revamped on-air presentation and branding for its NBA coverage, developed with the creative agency Big Block, as well as a new logo. The new design was inspired by "premium" consumer brands, and places a heavier focus on team logos and colors as the basis of its design, as opposed to visual environments and settings. When introduced during the pre-season, the new package used a noticeably large scorebar, although it was reduced in size by the start of the regular season; the scoreboard design would change until the 2021–22 season.

For the 2022–23 season, ESPN introduced another major overhaul of its NBA presentation, adopting a new smaller, flat scoreboard (which will follow jersey colors), and new theme music described as being more "contemporary".

Announcers

2002–03
 Brad Nessler/Bill Walton/Michelle Tafoya
 Mike Tirico/Tom Tolbert/David Aldridge
 John Saunders or Brent Musburger/Sean Elliott/Sal Masekela

Originally, ESPN (and ABC's) lead broadcast team was Brad Nessler and Bill Walton. Nessler and Walton (eventually joined by Tom Tolbert on ABC) worked NBA Wednesday games most weeks during the 2002–03 season. For NBA Friday, Mike Tirico and Tom Tolbert worked late night West Coast games while John Saunders and Sean Elliott did the early games, with Brent Musburger sometimes taking the place of Saunders. For the playoffs, ESPN added Jim Durham to its list of television play-by-play voices and used the ABC main team of Nessler, Walton and Tolbert for its coverage of the 2003 Eastern Conference Finals.

2003–04
Brad Nessler/Sean Elliott and Dan Majerle/Michelle Tafoya
 Mike Tirico/Tom Tolbert/George Karl/David Aldridge
 Mike Breen or Jim Durham or Brent Musburger/Bill Walton/Sal Masekela
John Saunders/Bill Walton/Stuart Scott (First "NBA Wednesday" game of the season; Knicks vs. Magic. The Nessler crew announce team called the second game of the doubleheader between the Cavaliers and the Kings.)

After low ratings on ABC and for the Conference Finals, ESPN reshuffled its announcing group. With the addition of Al Michaels to the ABC NBA line-up, ESPN dissolved the Nessler-Tolbert-Walton team, keeping Nessler as the main announcer but pairing him with Sean Elliott and Dan Majerle. Walton was demoted significantly, working games sporadically (including most of the ESPN NBA Sunday games with either Jim Durham or Brent Musburger). Tolbert stayed with Mike Tirico in a new three-man booth that also included newcomer George Karl.

Also added to the ESPN line-up was Mike Breen, who became the number three announcer behind Tirico and Nessler. Breen worked most of his games with Bill Walton.

For the 2004 Eastern Conference Final, ESPN used Nessler along with ABC's lead analyst Doc Rivers for every game of the series. Game 6 between Detroit and Indiana was the last NBA game Nessler has called to date.

2004–05
 Mike Breen/Bill Walton or Len Elmore/Jim Gray
 Jim Durham/Steve Jones or Dr. Jack Ramsey/Lisa Salters
 Mike Tirico/Tom Tolbert/Dana Jacobson
 Brent Musburger/Greg Anthony/Jim Gray(Sunday Nights)

Brad Nessler was dropped from ESPN/ABC's NBA coverage altogether starting with the 2004-05 NBA season. Mike Breen was promoted to lead announcer for ESPN, continuing to work games with Bill Walton (including the Pacers–Pistons brawl). Sean Elliott was dropped, along with Dan Majerle, Doc Rivers (who had become coach of the Boston Celtics) and George Karl (who left during the season to coach the Denver Nuggets). Jim Durham's role increased and ESPN hired former NBC analyst Steve Jones (Durham and Jones would work several regular season games together). ESPN did not use Jones and former cohort Bill Walton in games together during the regular season. Tom Tolbert's role decreased significantly; he was reduced primarily to West Coast games.

In the playoffs, ESPN used the team of Mike Breen and Bill Walton for its coverage of the 2005 Western Conference Final. Al Michaels partnered with newly added Hubie Brown for the NBA Finals on ABC.

2005–06
 Mike Tirico or Brent Musburger/Bill Walton/Mark Jones
 Jim Durham or Mike Tirico/Steve Jones/Jim Gray
 Brent Musburger/Tom Tolbert/Jim Gray

ESPN's announcing teams remained stable in the 2005-06 NBA season. Mike Breen and Bill Walton worked games together during the first half of the season; after Breen was promoted to lead broadcaster for ABC (due to Al Michaels defecting to NBC), Mike Tirico became the number two broadcaster and worked several games with Walton (and later, Steve Jones). During the 2006 NBA Playoffs, Breen worked games with ABC partner Hubie Brown, including the 2006 Eastern Conference Final.

2006–07
 Mike Breen/Hubie Brown/Lisa Salters
 Mike Tirico/Bill Walton/Jon Barry/Jim Gray
 Mark Jones or Dave Pasch/Tom Tolbert/Kara Lawson
 John Saunders/Greg Anthony/Tim Legler/Jim Gray (Sunday nights)

For the 2006-07 NBA season, Hubie Brown moved to ESPN full-time as the lead color commentator, paired with Mike Breen. Mike Tirico and Bill Walton remained as the number two team, with Steve Jones being replaced by newcomer Jon Barry. Tom Tolbert remained in his reduced role, in a broadcast team with either Mark Jones or ESPN WNBA play-by-play man Dave Pasch. John Saunders, with former NBA Shootaround colleagues Greg Anthony and Tim Legler worked Sunday night games televised by ESPN, as they had in the previous season. Fred Hickman became the primary studio host, working with a rotating team of analysts. Additions included Jamal Mashburn and Allan Houston.

ESPN increased its number of female analysts, adding current WNBA players Becky Hammon and Kara Lawson as sideline reporters. Swin Cash, of the Detroit Shock, was added as a studio analyst, debuting on NBA Shootaround early in the season. Doris Burke continued as a sideline reporter, while Lisa Salters (who had added Saturday Night Football to her duties) cut down on working NBA Friday games. On January 12, 2007, Kara Lawson was the analyst alongside play-by-play man Mark Jones for ESPN's Washington Wizards-New Orleans/Oklahoma City Hornets game. During this season, ABC's coverage of the NBA was fully integrated in ESPN.

2007–08
 Mike Breen/Jeff Van Gundy/Mark Jackson/Michelle Tafoya
 Mike Tirico/Hubie Brown/Lisa Salters
 Dan Shulman or Mark Jones/Jon Barry
 Dave Pasch/Rick Carlisle/Ric Bucher
 Dave Pasch/Doris Burke/Heather Cox

In the 2007–08 season, Jeff Van Gundy joined ESPN's coverage, pairing with Mike Breen on the lead broadcast team. Mike Tirico and Hubie Brown, who worked ABC games together last season, formed the number two team, with Dan Shulman replacing Tirico when he had Monday Night Football commitments. Bill Walton became ESPN's lead studio analyst, along with Stuart Scott and Stephen A. Smith. Mark Jones also hosted NBA Shootaround, and occasionally paired with Jon Barry as the third team, replacing Shulman. Tom Tolbert, who called the NBA Finals for ABC just 4 years earlier, was dropped, along with reporter Jim Gray. Rick Carlisle and Jalen Rose also were added, giving analysis on Sportscenter and occasionally appearing on NBA Shootaround. On December 31, 2007 analyst Kiki Vandeweghe left ESPN to pursue a role with the New Jersey Nets.

Personalities

NBA Countdown
NBA Countdown, previously NBA Shootaround, is ESPN's main studio program, airing before each game telecast. ESPN's in-game studio programs originally consisted of Kevin Frazier and Tim Hardaway on Fridays with Stuart Scott replacing Frazier on Wednesdays. After horrible reviews for Hardaway, ESPN brought in Greg Anthony to replace him on Friday nights. Frazier and Anthony became ESPN's main studio team and worked most of the playoffs. For the 2003 Eastern Conference Finals, ESPN used ABC's halftime team of Mike Tirico and Sean Elliott for all the games.

2003–04 was the first year of the longest-tenured ESPN studio team. Frazier and Anthony were joined by controversial writer Stephen A. Smith and NBA legend Bill Laimbeer. Laimbeer, departing to continue coaching in the WNBA, was replaced by Tim Legler during the 2004 NBA Playoffs. Smith, Legler and Anthony were joined by John Saunders (replacing Frazier, who left to host Entertainment Tonight) from late 2004 to the end of the 2005–2006 season.

ESPN's studio team was generally more criticized than praised. After the Pacers–Pistons brawl, ESPN's studio team came under severe criticism, both by the media and by ESPN itself for their stance regarding the actions of Indiana Pacer Ron Artest (who entered the stands to confront a fan, sparking the melee). Saunders came down hard on Detroit fans, referring to them as "punks," while Anthony and Legler defended Artest.

For the 2006-07 NBA season, Saunders was replaced by Fred Hickman, with the remaining team left intact. Previous reports by The Big Lead.com and The New York Post indicated that Anthony, Legler and Smith along with Saunders would be replaced by Dan Patrick, Michael Wilbon and Mark Jackson. Smith's role was significantly reduced, as he would no longer appear in studio with Hickman, Legler and Anthony, instead appearing during "The A List", a segment during the pregame show.

The program was hosted by either Hannah Storm, Stuart Scott or Mark Jones, alongside analysts Chris Mullin, Jalen Rose, Jamal Mashburn, Jon Barry and Michael Wilbon.

The program was also moved from ABC-owned studios at Times Square in New York City to ESPN's headquarters in Bristol, Connecticut.

The format changed for the 2011–2012 season. The show moved from Bristol to ESPN's West Coast headquarters in Los Angeles. Storm, Scott and Jones were dropped from the program and the host role abandoned. Instead, four analysts (Wilbon, Barry, Magic Johnson, and Chris Broussard) discuss scores, games, and other topics in more of a free form style than previously used.

The RV Tour
From the 2007–08 season through the 2013–14 season, commercials for the NBA on ESPN have always featured a recreational vehicle taking NBA players, ESPN announcers, mascots, and even celebrities to a cross-country tour. During each commercial, the featured NBA player or mascot always employ a prank on an ESPN broadcast personality. Most of the jokes have featured Mike Breen and Jeff Van Gundy as the 'victims' of each prank. Following the success of the commercials, the NBA on ESPN RV became an iconic figure of NBA broadcasts on the network, and it is prominently seen on select on NBA arenas during games covered by ESPN, during which arriving fans take a tour of the RV and participate in various activities.

The RV Tour commercials have been discontinued as of the 2014–15 season.

Ratings

ESPN's highest rated NBA game was Game 5 of the 2006 Eastern Conference Finals between the Miami Heat and Detroit Pistons. The game scored a 5.5 cable Nielsen rating, with nearly five million viewers. To put that in context, Monday Night Football on ESPN posted ratings of 9+ in two of its first three telecasts. ESPN's highest rated regular season contest was the first matchup between Shaquille O'Neal and Yao Ming. The game between the Los Angeles Lakers and Houston Rockets scored a 3.82 cable Nielsen rating.

Generally, ESPN's regular season ratings are the same as competitor TNT's. During the playoffs, TNT has higher ratings, especially during the Conference Finals (from 2003 to 2005, TNT's Conference Final ratings were at least a full ratings point higher than ESPN's: 4.6 to 2.8 in 2003, 6.3 to 3.8 in 2004 and 5.0 to 4.0 in 2005). In 2006, for the first time ever, ESPN's Conference Final coverage averaged higher ratings than TNT's, averaging a 4.8 to TNT's 4.6.

ESPN2
ESPN2 aired a handful of NBA regular season games from 2002 to 2006, typically in January, when prime time golf tournaments preempted coverage on ESPN. On several occasions, ESPN2 would air the first game of a doubleheader, while ESPN air the second game. Starting with the 2006–2007 season, regular season games on ESPN2 were discontinued. During the playoffs, ESPN2 airs games that otherwise would not have appeared on any outlet other than NBA TV, mostly on Friday nights and only during the first round.

ESPN2 NBA coverage is mostly made up of studio shows, notably NBA Coast to Coast. NBA Coast to Coast, formerly known as NBA Fastbreak Tuesday and NBA Nation, is a two-hour long Tuesday night studio show that features live cut-ins to games throughout the league. In addition to Coast to Coast, ESPN2 airs several editions of NBA Fastbreak, ESPN's NBA oriented highlight show.

Despite airing fewer than forty NBA games in its eleven years of existence, ESPN2 did televise NBA legend Michael Jordan's final game in Chicago in January 2003.

ESPN2 also aired Kobe Bryant's final game against the Utah Jazz on April 13, 2016.

ESPN2 also aired a LeBron James potential record breaking game on February 3, 2023

ESPN2 is the primary outlet for ESPN WNBA coverage, televising regular season games, the WNBA Finals and the WNBA Draft. WNBA Shootaround, the WNBA equivalent of ESPN's NBA pregame show, airs sporadically on the network, typically before presentations of WNBA Tuesday.

See also
 The Decision (TV special), LeBron James' 2010 free agency announcement

References

External links

ESPN
ESPN original programming
ESPN2 original programming
1982 American television series debuts
1984 American television series endings
1980s American television series
2000s American television series
2010s American television series
2020s American television series
2002 American television series debuts
Sports telecast series
American television series revived after cancellation